Nenning may refer to:

Günther Nenning (1921 − 2006), Austrian journalist
Amsterdam slang, a verb expressing a broad concept of doing any activity that makes you feel good or happy